Rhydon Mays Call (January 13, 1858 – December 15, 1927) was a United States district judge of the United States District Court for the Southern District of Florida.

Education and career

Born on January 13, 1858, in Fernandina Beach, Florida, Call received a Bachelor of Laws in 1878 from Washington and Lee University School of Law. He was the nephew of U.S. Senator Wilkinson Call. He entered private practice in Jacksonville, Florida from 1881 to 1893. He was a Judge of the Circuit Court of Florida for the Fourth Judicial Circuit from 1893 to 1913.

Federal judicial service

Call received a recess appointment from President Woodrow Wilson on March 26, 1913, to a seat on the United States District Court for the Southern District of Florida vacated by Judge John Moses Cheney. He was nominated to the same position by President Wilson on April 12, 1913. He was confirmed by the United States Senate on April 24, 1913, and received his commission the same day. His service terminated on December 15, 1927, due to his death.

References

1858 births
1927 deaths
Washington and Lee University alumni
Judges of the United States District Court for the Southern District of Florida
United States district court judges appointed by Woodrow Wilson
20th-century American judges
People from Fernandina Beach, Florida